The men's 50 metre backstroke competition of the swimming events at the 2013 Mediterranean Games took place on June 21 at the Mersin Olympic Swimming Pool in Mersin, Turkey.

The race consisted of one length of the pool in backstroke.

Schedule 
All times are Eastern European Summer Time (UTC+03:00)

Records
Prior to this competition, the existing world and Mediterranean Games records were as follows:

Results
All times are in minutes and seconds.

Heats

Final

References

Swimming at the 2013 Mediterranean Games